Jiangbei may refer to:

 Henan Jiangbei Province, during the Yuan dynasty
 Jiangbei District, Chongqing, China
 Jiangbei District, Ningbo, Zhejiang, China
 Jiangbei, Meizhou, Guangdong, China
 Jiangbei (region), north of the Yangtze River, especially in Jiangsu
 Jiangbei people